Jake Kerr (born 13 April 1996) is a Scotland international rugby union player who plays as a hooker for Bristol Bears in Premiership Rugby. He is the brother of Scottish distance runner Josh Kerr

Rugby union career

Amateur career

He has lifted the Brewin Dolphin Scottish Schools’ Cup on three occasions (under-16 and U18 twice) while attending George Watson's College. Kerr has played for both Watsonians and Boroughmuir in the BT Premiership in his native Scotland.

Professional career

His professional performances contributed to a move to Leicester Tigers (on the 20th of September 2017) and inclusion in their 2017/2018 Aviva Premiership senior squad. He was released in April 2021 and subsequently signed a short-term deal with Bristol Bears.

International career

On 16 January 2019 Gregor Townsend named three hookers among seven uncapped players, for his Scotland Six Nations squad. Kerr was among those selected.

Kerr came off the bench in Scotland's opening game of the 2019 Six Nations, a 33–20 win against Italy, to claim his first cap.

References

External links
Leicester Profile
Scotland U20s Profile

1996 births
Living people
Scottish rugby union players
Leicester Tigers players
Scotland international rugby union players
Bristol Bears players
Rugby union players from Edinburgh
Rugby union hookers